NGC 782 is a barred spiral galaxy located in the constellation Eridanus about 160 million light-years from the Milky Way. It was discovered by British astronomer John Herschel in 1834.

A type Ia supernova designated SN 2011eb was discovered in this galaxy on July 9, 2011.

References 

0782
Barred spiral galaxies
Eridanus (constellation)
007379